Brady Independent School District is a public school district based in Brady, Texas (USA). In addition to Brady, the district also serves the town of Melvin. Located in McCulloch County, a small portion of Brady ISD extends into eastern Concho County.

Finances
As of the 2010–2011 school year, the appraised valuation of property in the district was $350,855,000. The maintenance tax rate was $0.104 and the bond tax rate was $0.033 per $100 of appraised valuation.

Academic achievement
In 2011, the school district was rated "recognized" by the Texas Education Agency.  Thirty-five percent of districts in Texas in 2011 received the same rating. No state accountability ratings will be given to districts in 2012. A school district in Texas can receive one of four possible rankings from the Texas Education Agency: Exemplary (the highest possible ranking), Recognized, Academically Acceptable, and Academically Unacceptable (the lowest possible ranking).

Historical district TEA accountability ratings
2011: Recognized
2010: Recognized
2009: Academically Acceptable
2008: Academically Acceptable
2007: Academically Acceptable
2006: Academically Acceptable
2005: Academically Acceptable
2004: Academically Acceptable

Schools
In the 2011–2012 school year, the district had students in four schools.
Regular instructional
Brady High School (Grades 9–12)
Brady Middle (Grades 6–8)
Brady Elementary (Grades PK-5)
Alternative instructional
Alternative Education Program (Grades 6–12)

Athletics
Brady was awarded the 1959 Class AA state football championship via forfeit over Stamford (the actual score was 19-14 Stamford).  This was the first and, as of 2008, one of only two instances where a Texas state football championship was awarded via forfeit. The other instance was in 1988 when Converse Judson was awarded the Class AAAAA championship over Dallas Carter.

See also

List of school districts in Texas
List of high schools in Texas

References

External links
Brady ISD

School districts in McCulloch County, Texas
School districts in Concho County, Texas